The Irwin County Detention Center is a private prison operated by Louisiana-based LaSalle Corrections located in Irwin County, Georgia. At least 43 women prisoners and a whistleblower nurse came forward alleging non-consensual surgeries and medically unnecessary procedures, including hysterectomies, were performed by a gynecologist affiliated with the jail.
Following the allegations of abuse, ICE terminated its contract with the facility.

On December 22, 2020, forty migrant women being held at the Irwin County Detention Center immigration detention center filed a lawsuit alleging abuse and unnecessary forced medical procedures, including the hysterectomies. The women also complained of retaliation and subpar COVID-19 treatment. The Department of Justice (DoJ) and  Department of Homeland Security (DHS) are conducting investigations; advocates have called upon President Joe Biden and Congress to investigate the abuse and close the Irwin County detention center.  ICE opted to let its contract with LaSalle expire and not renew it; in September 2021, ICE removed its immigration-related detainees from the prison with the completion of the contract.

See also
 Glades County Detention Center

References

External links
Irwin County Detention Center

Prisons in Georgia (U.S. state)
Buildings and structures in Irwin County, Georgia
Immigration detention centers and prisons in the United States
U.S. Immigration and Customs Enforcement